The first siege of Jinju was one of two battles during the Japanese invasions of Korea – the first in 1592, and the second in 1593. The first siege attempt by the Japanese failed, leaving the Koreans holding the castle. The second siege of Jinju was successful, and it fell to the Japanese.

Military Strength

Joeson
Kim Si-min – 3,700 soldiers
Yi Gwang-ak – 100 soldiers
Gwak Jaeu – 200 irregulars
Choi Gyeong-hoe, Im Gye-yeong – 2,000 irregulars
Total 3,800 soldiers and 2,200 irregulars

Japan
Ukita Hideie – 10,000 soldiers
Hosokawa Tadaoki – 3,500 soldiers
Hasegawa Hidekazu – 5,000 soldiers
Kimura Shigekore – 3,500 soldiers
Kato Mitsuyasu – 1,747 soldiers
Shinzo Naosada – 300 soldiers
Kasuya Takenori – 200 soldiers
Ota Kazuyosi – 160 soldiers
Total 30,000 soldiers

Background
Jinju castle was an important castle that guarded Jeolla province. Ukita Hideie and Hosokawa Tadaoki agreed on taking Jinju castle because if the Japanese captured it, it would open up a new road to Jeolla, and they would be able to attack Gwak Jaeu's guerilla forces hiding in the area. Jeolla was also a place for plenty of loot. Ukita also agreed to recapture Changwon, a small fortress that led to Jinju castle. Therefore, an army of 30,000 men to recapture Changwon and Jinju set out. The Japanese Seventh Contingent arrived at Jinju on 8 November with 30,000 men under Kato Mitsuyasu, Hasegawa Hidekazu, Nagaoka Tadaoki, and Kimura Shigeji.

Yu Sung-in, commander of right Gyeongsang province, placed his army in front of the gate of Jinju. General Yu Sung-in requested permission to enter into the Jinju. However, Japanese arquebuses reached behind the reinforcements. Kim Si-min inevitably rejected the request, and Yu Sung-in ultimately agreed to Kim Si-min's words. The reinforcements were annihilated by the Japanese arquebuses.

Siege of Jinju
The Japanese heartily approached Jinju fortress. They expected another easy victory at Jinju but the Korean general Kim Si-min defied the Japanese and stood firm with his 3,800 men. Again, the Koreans were outnumbered. Kim Si-min had recently acquired around 170 arquebuses, equivalent to what the Japanese used. Kim Si-min had them trained and believed he could defend Jinju.

The Japanese charged and began to bring ladders to scale the wall. They also brought a siege tower to try to gain the higher ground. As a counter, the Koreans unleashed massive volleys of cannons, arrows, and bullets. Surprised, Hosokawa tried another angle of approach by using his arquebuses to cover the soldiers scaling the wall. This still had no success because the Koreans ignored the bullets and smashed ladders with rocks and axes. When the Koreans began to lob mortars down at the Japanese, the Japanese began to lose even more men.

After three days of fighting, Kim Si-min was hit by a bullet on the side of his head and fell, unable to command his forces. The Japanese commanders then pressed even harder on the Koreans to dishearten them, but the Koreans fought on. The Japanese soldiers were still unable to scale the walls even with heavy fire from arquebuses. The Koreans were not in a good position since Kim Si-min was wounded and the garrison was now running low on ammunition.

Reinforcements
Gwak Jae-u, one of the main leaders of the Righteous armies of Korea arrived at night with an extremely small band, not enough to relieve the Koreans at Jinju. Gwak ordered his men to grab attention by blowing on horns and making noises. About 3,000 guerrillas and irregular forces arrived at the scene. At this time, the Japanese commanders realized their danger and were forced to abandon the siege and retreated.

Aftermath
The Righteous army was too small to relieve Jinju. But, the retreat of Japanese soldiers heartened the Koreans and the biggest thing earned from the siege was that the Korean morale was boosted greatly.

The first battle of Jinju along with the Battle of Hansan Island and the Battle of Haengju are regarded as the three most important battles of the war.

In 1593, the Japanese returned the next summer and burned Jinju to the ground.

See also
Battle of Hansan Island
Battle of Haengju
Siege of Jinju (1593)
List of castles in Korea

References

Bibliography

 
 
 
 
 
 
 
 
 
 
 桑田忠親 [Kuwata, Tadachika], ed., 舊參謀本部編纂, [Kyu Sanbo Honbu], 朝鮮の役 [Chousen no Eki]　(日本の戰史 [Nihon no Senshi] Vol. 5), 1965.

External links
Jinju

1592 in Asia
1592 in Japan
Jinju 1592
Jinju 1592
Jinju 1592
Conflicts in 1592